Mordellistena edashigei is a beetle in the genus Mordellistena of the family Mordellidae. It was described in 1956 by Chûjô.

References

edashigei
Beetles described in 1956